Pocker Sahib Memorial Orphanage College (PSMO) is a government-aided private junior college affiliated to the University of Calicut. It was established in 1968 under the management of the Tirurangadi Muslim Orphanage.

History
The college was established in 1968 as a government-aided junior college affiliated to the University of Kerala. In the same year, it was re-affiliated to the University of Calicut after the reorganization of the university.

It was upgraded as a first grade college in 1972 and a Post Graduate College in 1980. Twelve degree courses and seven post graduate courses are offered at the college catering to the higher education needs of around 1800 students.

The college was mainly intended for the educational progress of the orphans of the Muslim community but it also fulfills the educational aspirations of students from all communities.

Location
The college is situated at Tirurangadi a distance of 13 km from Calicut University Campus, 18.1 km from the District Headquarters at Malappuram, 10.3 km from the Parappanangadi Railway station, 17 km from Calicut Airport and 1 km from the NH 17 at Kakkad.

Notable alumni
 K. T. Jaleel, Former Higher Education Minister of Kerala
 N. Samsudheen,  MLA
 M. M. Akbar, Islamic Preacher
 Mani C. Kappan, MLA
 K. V. Rabiya, Social worker

See also

References

External links

PSMO College Web Site
PSMO COLLEGE UAE ALUMNI
Media One article
University of Calicut
University Grants Commission
National Assessment and Accreditation Council

Colleges affiliated with the University of Calicut
Arts and Science colleges in Kerala
Universities and colleges in Malappuram district
Educational institutions established in 1968
1968 establishments in Kerala